St Catharine's Convent in Augsburg, Germany was a community of Dominican nuns.

It was founded in the Am Gries suburb of the city in 1243 before moving into the city centre eight years later. It was dissolved in 1802 and the nuns vacated the monastery in 1807. In 1834 some of the convent buildings were re-used to house the Königliche Polytechnische Schule and a trade school. In 1835 the former convent church was converted into the Staatsgalerie Altdeutscher Meister, a branch of the Bavarian State Painting Collections, which is still there today. In 1877 the building was taken over by a district primary school, now known as the Holbein-Gymnasium.

References

1243 establishments
1802 disestablishments
Monasteries in Bavaria
Dominican monasteries in Germany
Former Christian monasteries in Germany
Buildings and structures in Augsburg
Dominican monasteries of nuns